Vermont was amongst the first places to abolish slavery by constitutional dictum.
Although estimates place the number of enslaved persons at 25 in 1770 slavery was banned outright upon the founding of Vermont in July 1777, and by a further provision in its Constitution, existing male slaves become free at the age of 21 and females at the age of 18. Not only did Vermont's legislature agree to abolish slavery entirely, it also moved to provide full voting rights for African American males. According to the Smithsonian's  National Museum of African-American History and Culture, "Vermont's July 1777 declaration was not entirely altruistic either. While it did set an independent tone from the 13 colonies, the declaration's wording was vague enough to let Vermont's already-established slavery practices continue."

Chapter I of the Constitution, titled "A Declaration of the Rights of the Inhabitants of the State of Vermont" said:

The state of Vermont was created in 1777 by settlers who had purchased their land from the colonial governor of New Hampshire and resisted subsequent attempts by New York's colonial government to exert jurisdiction over the area, called the New Hampshire Grants. These settlers, who named the former New Hampshire Grants "Vermont", wished to create a popular government representing their interests, among them abolishing slavery. After 1777, Vermont was repeatedly denied admission to the Union and existed as a largely unrecognized state until it was admitted to the Union as the fourteenth state in 1791. Vermont's admission to the Union made the state subject to the Fugitive Slave Clause of the Constitution of the United States (Article IV, Section 2, Clause 3) requiring fugitive slaves fleeing into a state whose laws forbid slavery to be returned.  Later the state was subject to the Fugitive Slave Acts of 1793 and 1850, allowing slave owners to recover fugitive slaves who fled to Vermont.

Harvey Amani Whitfield's book, The Problem of Slavery in Early Vermont, reports that among those violating the abolition of slavery were Vermont Supreme Court Judge Stephen Jacob and Levi Allen, brother of the military leader Ethan Allen.

In 1858 the "Freedom Act" was ratified, declaring that any slave who reached Vermont was automatically freed.

1790 census
The 1790 census of the United States did not reach Vermont until the following year, 1791, because the government of Vermont took the position that Vermont was not a part of the United States until its admission to the Union in 1791.

The 1790 census, as published, reported 16 slaves in Vermont, all in Bennington County.  This was due to a compilation error; the matter is discussed at some length in The Connecticut River Valley in southern Vermont and New Hampshire; historical sketches published in 1929.

However, in historian Ira Berlin's 1998 work Many Thousands Gone: The First Two Centuries of Slavery in North America he cited the 1790 census figure of 16.

Notes and references

External links 
 Vermont and the abolition of slavery

Additional reading
Harvey Amani Whitfield, The Problem of Slavery in Early Vermont, Vermont Historical Society (2014).

Vermont
Vermont
Slavery
slavery
Slavery
Vermont